During the 2001–02 season, FC Tirol Innsbruck played in the Austrian Football Bundesliga, the highest tier of the Austrian football league system.

Season summary
Tirol Innsbruck won their third successive league title. However, the club's financial obligations, including an annual wage bill of €10 million, ultimately saw the collapse of the club at the end of the season. The club were unable to post a €4.5 million bond with the league, resulting in the loss of their license to play in the Bundesliga. With debts totaling €16 million, the club went bankrupt. A successor club, FC Wacker Tirol, was formed, and merged with third-tier club Wattens to avoid starting in the bottom tier.

Players

First team squad
Squad at end of season

Competitions

Bundesliga

League table

UEFA Champions League

Qualifying rounds

Third qualifying round

UEFA Cup

First round

Second round

References

FC Tirol Innsbruck seasons
FC Tirol Innsbruck
Austrian football championship-winning seasons